James Henry Hammond (November 15, 1807 – November 13, 1864) was an attorney, politician, and planter from South Carolina. He served as a United States representative from 1835 to 1836, the 60th Governor of South Carolina from 1842 to 1844, and a United States senator from 1857 to 1860. A slave owner, he is considered one of the strongest supporters of slavery in the years before the American Civil War.

Acquiring property through marriage, Hammond ultimately owned 22 square miles, several plantations and houses, and more than 300 enslaved people. Through his wife's family, he was a brother-in-law of Wade Hampton II and uncle to his children, including Wade Hampton III. When the senior Hampton learned that Hammond had raped his four Hampton nieces as teenagers, he made the scandal public. The publicizing of his crimes was initially thought to have derailed Hammond's career but he later was elected to the United States Senate.

Biography
Born November 15, 1807, in Newberry County, South Carolina, to Elisha and Catherine Fox (Spann) Hammond, he graduated from South Carolina College in 1825, where he was a member of the Euphradian Society, and went on to teach school, write for a newspaper, and study law. He was admitted to the bar in 1828 and started a practice in Columbia, South Carolina. He established a newspaper there in support of nullification.

Hammond "secured his financial independence" by marrying Catherine Elizabeth Fitzsimmons, who was a shy, plain 17-year-old with a substantial dowry. He became a wealthy man through this marriage and entered the planter class. He ultimately owned  of land, a number of plantation houses, and more than 300 enslaved persons.

After his marriage, he was elected to the United States House of Representatives as a member of the Nullifier Party, serving from 1835 until his resignation the next year due to ill health. After spending two years in Europe, he returned to South Carolina and engaged in agricultural pursuits; managing his large holdings took much of his time.

He was elected as governor of South Carolina, serving from 1842 to 1844. The legislature chose him for the United States Senate in 1857, following the death of Andrew P. Butler, and he served from 1857 until his resignation in 1860 in light of South Carolina's secession from the Union. Hammond died on November 13, 1864 (two days before his fifty-seventh birthday), at what is now the Redcliffe Plantation State Historic Site in Beech Island, South Carolina.

Pro-slavery
A Democrat, Hammond was perhaps best known during his lifetime as an outspoken defender of slavery and states' rights. He popularized the phrase that "Cotton is King" in his March 4, 1858, speech to the US Senate, saying:

"In all social systems there must be a class to do the menial duties, to perform the drudgery of life...It constitutes the very mudsill of society." He went on to utter the oft-repeated words "You dare not make war on cotton — no power on earth dares make war upon it. Cotton is king."

In his writings, he consistently compared the South's "well compensated" slaves to the free labor of the North, describing the latter as "scantily compensated" slaves (as he termed the hired skilled laborers and operatives).

Going beyond articles in local newspapers, he co-authored The Pro-Slavery Argument with William Harper, Thomas Roderick Dew, and William Gilmore Simms. Hammond and Simms were part of a "sacred circle" of intellectuals, including Edmund Ruffin, Nathaniel Beverley Tucker, and George Frederick Holmes, who promoted reformation in the South in various forms. As supporters of slavery, they both justified it in terms of stewardship of inferior beings and promoted slaveholders' improvement of their treatment of slaves.

Hammond promoted Redcliffe, his plantation in Beech Island, South Carolina, as his ideal of the perfectly run plantation in his Plantation manual, 1857-58. It includes a wide range of material, with detailed rules regulating treatment of pregnant and nursing slaves (whom he allowed to nurse their infants for 12 months), old slaves no longer fit for heavy field work, together with rules about clothing, quarters, food, etc., in addition to livestock and crop management.

Hammond rejected any government encroachment on slaveholding, even in wartime. When the South Carolina government requisitioned 16 of his slaves to improve fortifications for Charleston, he refused, calling it "wrong every way and odious." Also, when a Confederate army officer stopped by to requisition some grain, he tore up the requisition order, tossed it out a window, and wrote about it that it compensated him too little, and that it was like "branding on my forehead: 'Slave'".

Relationships and sexual assault
Hammond's Secret and Sacred Diaries (not published until 1989) described, without embarrassment, his sexual abuse over two years of four teenage nieces, daughters of his sister-in-law Ann Fitzsimmons and her husband Wade Hampton II. He blamed his behavior on what he described as the seductiveness of the "extremely affectionate" young women. The scandal "derailed his political career" for a decade to come after Wade Hampton III publicly accused him in 1843 when Hammond was governor. He was "ostracized by polite society" for some time, but in the late 1850s, he was nonetheless elected by the state legislature as a U.S. senator.

Hammond's damage to the girls was far-reaching. Their social prospects were destroyed. Considered to have tarnished social reputations as a result of his behavior, none of the four ever married.

Hammond was known to have repeatedly raped two female slaves, one of whom may have been his own daughter. He raped the first slave, Sally Johnson, when she was 18 years old. Such behavior was not uncommon among white men of power at the time; their mixed-race children were born into slavery and remained there unless the fathers took action to free them. Later, Hammond raped Sally Johnson's daughter, Louisa, who was a year old baby when he bought her mother; the first rape apparently occurred when Louisa was 12; she also bore several of his children.

His wife left him for a few years after he repeatedly raped the enslaved girl, taking their own children with her. She later returned to her husband.

In the late 20th century, historians learned that Hammond as a young man had a homosexual relationship with a college friend, Thomas Jefferson Withers, which is attested by two sexually explicit letters sent from Withers to Hammond in 1826. The letters, which are held among the Hammond Papers at the University of South Carolina, were first published by researcher Martin Duberman in 1981; they are notable as rare documentary evidence of same-sex relationships in the antebellum United States.

Legacy 
Hammond School in Columbia, South Carolina, was named the James H. Hammond Academy when founded in 1966. It was one of a number of private schools known as segregation academies, founded to preserve racial segregation in schools. Although many of these segregation academies are now defunct, Hammond School continued to develop; after the 1970s, it expanded its admission policy, as federal law mandated, to be non-discriminatory. The school changed its name to reflect this.

Hammond's quotes on slavery
Kirby Page used quotes from Hammond on slavery in his book Jesus or Christianity (1929):

"I firmly believe," said Governor J. H. Hammond, "that American slavery is not only not a sin, but especially commanded by God through Moses, and approved by Christ through his apostles."
Governor J. H. Hammond once said: "I endorse without reserve the much abused sentiment of Governor McDuffie, that 'slavery is the corner-stone of our republican edifice;' while I repudiate, as ridiculously absurd, that much lauded but nowhere accredited dogma of Mr. Jefferson that 'all men are born equal.'"

See also
Mudsill theory
Pro-slavery thought
21st Rule, 1836 House of Representatives anti-abolition "gag rule"
List of federal political sex scandals in the United States

Further reading
Bleser, Carol, Editor, Secret and Sacred, The Diaries of James Henry Hammond, a Southern Slaveholder, Oxford University Press, New York, 1988,

References

External links

Cotton is King speech before Congress
James Henry Hammond advocates slavery, Africans in America: Part 4, PBS
Biography of James Henry Hammond, SCIway 
Biography of James Henry Hammond, National Gallery of Art
Defense of Slavery, Biography of James Henry Hammond

|-

|-

1807 births
1864 deaths
19th-century American journalists
19th-century American lawyers
19th-century American male writers
19th-century American newspaper publishers (people)
19th-century American politicians
American male journalists
American proslavery activists
American rapists
American slave owners
American white supremacists
Bisexual politicians
Democratic Party governors of South Carolina
Democratic Party United States senators from South Carolina
Incestual abuse
Lawyers from Columbia, South Carolina
Democratic Party members of the United States House of Representatives from South Carolina
Nullifier Party members of the United States House of Representatives
Nullifier Party politicians
People from Beech Island, South Carolina
People from Newberry County, South Carolina
People of South Carolina in the American Civil War
Politicians from Columbia, South Carolina
South Carolina lawyers
University of South Carolina alumni
University of South Carolina trustees
Wade Hampton family
United States senators who owned slaves